Uzhhorod is the main railway station in Uzhhorod, Ukraine. It also is used as a port on the Slovakia–Ukraine border for freight transport. The rail border checkpoint is part of the Chop customs.

The station was opened to the public in October 2004. It is on Heorhiy Kirpa Square in Uzhhorod.

History

The former building of the Ungvar (Uzhhorod) Railway Station (renovated in 2004 and renamed as suburban railway station) was built in the early years of the 20th century. In the late 1970s, the Soviet Government decided to build a new station building for the 1980 Olympic Games, but the project was never completed.

In 2002, the Ukrainian Cabinet of Ministers decided to build a new modern bigger railway station complex. The works began in 2003. In October 2004 Ukrainian Prime Minister Viktor Yanukovych and Uzhhorod city mayor  opened the new station complex to the public.

The complex today 
The suburban station serves trains to stations in the Transcarpathian Region. The central railway station serves departures and arrivals to and from:
 Kyiv
 Lviv
 Odessa
 Kharkiv
 Zaporizhzhia

!Previous station!!!!Operator!!!!Next Station

Gallery

See also
 Chop railway station, still on the Ukrainian side of the border
 Čierna nad Tisou railway station, on the Slovakian side
 Uzhhorod – Košice broad gauge track
 Slovakia–Ukraine border
 Uzhhorod (border checkpoint)

References

External links
 Border checkpoints with Slovakia
 Uzhhorod railway station at Railwayz.info

Central Rail Terminal
Railway stations in Zakarpattia Oblast
Slovakia–Ukraine border crossings
Railway station
Railway stations opened in 1872
1872 establishments in Austria-Hungary
Transport in Uzhhorod